Juan Martínez (13 November 1924 – 15 August 1994) was a Spanish equestrian. He competed in two events at the 1960 Summer Olympics.

References

1924 births
1994 deaths
Spanish male equestrians
Olympic equestrians of Spain
Equestrians at the 1960 Summer Olympics
Sportspeople from Valencia